Metrocon is an annual three-day anime convention held during July/August at the Tampa Convention Center in Tampa, Florida. It is Florida's largest anime convention and organized by Team Dynamite Productions. The convention evolved from meetups of AnimeMetro.com members.

Programming
The convention typically offers an artist alley, autograph sessions, contests, dances/raves, LAN gaming, main events (such as the Anime Human chess Match, Costume and Cosplay Contests, Fantasy Masquerade, Fire Show, and Professional Wrestling), panels, tabletop game rooms, vendors room, video game rooms, and video rooms screening anime. Metrocon also hosts a blood drive. The convention brings $3.5 million to the area's economy.

History
Metrocon was first held in 2003 at the Crowne Plaza Hotel and after growth moved to the Tampa Convention Center in 2005. The convention had issues in 2008 with rowdy attendees from the Red Bull Flugtag event also occurring at the Tampa Convention Center. In 2009, the founder and CEO of Metrocon was arrested in Florida for violating Florida Statute 794.05 (unlawful sexual activity with certain minors) eight days before the convention. The conventions Director of Operations characterized the arrest as "an attack on the convention". The CEO stepped down from his position, with the Director of Operations and Head of Security taking over operations.

The convention added a fourth day when unique attendance hit over 10,000, with the first occurring in 2015. Game five of the 2015 Stanley Cup playoff finals was held during Metrocon 2015 at the Amalie Arena. Metrocon 2020 was cancelled due to the COVID-19 pandemic.

Event history

Amano's World
In 2006, Metrocon held a second convention known as Metrocon: Amano's World, which featured the works Yoshitaka Amano, who is best known for his Final Fantasy character designs and Vampire Hunter D illustrations.

Event history

References

External links 
Metrocon Website

Anime conventions in the United States
Recurring events established in 2003
2003 establishments in Florida
Annual events in Florida
Culture of Tampa, Florida
Festivals in Tampa, Florida
Conventions in Florida